The Things We Make is the debut album by English indie rock band Six by Seven. The album included the single "European Me", described by the NME as "one of the greatest debut singles of all time". The album featured numerous 'epic' tracks with "Oh! Dear", "European Me" and "88-92-96" all clocking in at almost seven minutes or more and "Spy Song" reaching almost nine minutes. Aside from "European Me", "88-92-96", "Candlelight" and "For You" were released as singles, with "Candlelight" reaching the lower regions of the singles charts. The album was ranked 13th in NMEs end-of-year poll for 1998.

Track listingThe Things We Make [Album Sampler]'
 "Candlelight"
 "For You"
 "Something Wild"
 "88-92-96"

Personnel
Chris Olley – vocals, guitar
Sam Hempton – guitar
Paul Douglas – bass
Chris Davis – drums
James Flower – Hammond organ, tenor saxophone

References

Six by Seven albums
1998 debut albums